A list of notable films produced in Greece in the 1990s.

1990s

External links
 Greek film at the IMDb

1990s
Greek
Films